Mamin is a Slavic surname, its feminine counterpart is Mamina. The surname is derived from the word мама (mama, meaning "mommy") and literally means Mommy's. It may refer to:

Nickname
 Mamin Kolyu, nickname of Bulgarian revolutionary Nikola Koev Nikolov (1880–1961)

Surname
 Alyona Mamina (born 1990), Russian sprinter
 Askar Mamin (born 1965), Prime Minister of Kazakhstan
 Dmitry Mamin-Sibiryak (1852–1912), Russian author 
 Maxim Mamin (ice hockey, born 1988), Russian ice hockey center 
 Maxim Mamin (ice hockey, born 1995), Russian ice hockey forward
 Yuri Mamin (born 1946), Russian film director, stage director, screenwriter, composer and author